William Hagler House, also known as Beech Hill and the Haigler House, is a historic home located near Grandin, Caldwell County, North Carolina.  It was built about 1838, and is a two-story brick structure on a fieldstone foundation.

The house was listed on the National Register of Historic Places in 1982.

References

Houses on the National Register of Historic Places in North Carolina
Houses completed in 1838
Houses in Caldwell County, North Carolina
National Register of Historic Places in Caldwell County, North Carolina